The 2014 Tianjin Health Industry Park was a professional tennis tournament played on clay courts. It was the first edition of the tournament and part of the 2014 ATP Challenger Tour and 2014 ITF Women's Circuit, offering a total of $50,000+H (ATP) and $25,000 (ITF) in prize money. It took place in Tianjin, China, the men's event took place from 16 to 22 June 2014 while the women's event took place from 19 to 25 May 2014.

Men's singles main-draw entrants

Seeds

 1 Rankings are as of June 9, 2014.

Other entrants
The following players received wildcards into the singles main draw:
  Li Zhe
  Gong Maoxin
  Yan Bai
  Wang Chuhan

The following players received entry from the qualifying draw:
  Ryan Agar
  Lu Yang
  Mikhail Ledovskikh
  Liu Siyu

Doubles main-draw entrants

Seeds

1 Rankings as of June 9, 2014.

Other entrants
The following pairs received wildcards into the doubles main draw:
  Ning Yuqing /  Ouyang Bowen
  Bai Yan /  Wu Di
  Gao Xin /  Wang Chuhan

Champions

Men's singles

 Blaž Kavčič def.  Alexander Kudryavtsev, 6–2, 3–6, 7–5

Women's singles
 Wang Qiang def.  Zhu Lin, 6–3, 6–2

Men's doubles

 Robin Kern /  Josselin Ouanna def.  Jason Jung /  Evan King, 6–7(3–7), 7–5, [10–8]

Women's doubles
 Liu Chang /  Tian Ran def.  Fatma Al-Nabhani /  Ankita Raina, 6–1, 7–5

External links

Tianjin Health Industry Park
Tianjin Health Industry Park
Tianjin Health Industry Park
Tianjin Health Industry Park
Tianjin Health Industry Park